Central Philippine Adventist College is private coeducational Christian college in Alegria, Murcia, Negros Occidental, Philippines. It is a part of the Seventh-day Adventist education system, the world's second largest Christian school system.
The college is  fully accredited by the Association of Christian Schools, Colleges and Universities-Accrediting Agency, Inc. (ACSCU-AAI), the Adventist Accrediting Agency (AAA) of General Conference of the Seventh-day Adventist Church and by the Department of Education of Southern Asia Pacific Division.

History

Beginnings
Shortly after Central Philippine Union Mission was organized in 1964, its leaders dreamt for a college in Central Philippines. Following the dream, CPUM spent years of “sightseeing” activities over all of the Visayas, in search of a favorable location. Finally the search ended in Alegria, Murcia, 23 kilometers from Bacolod City, with the purchase of 71 hectares for P 600,000. A donation of $64,000 by Mrs. May Chung enlarged the property by 35 hectares.

Events moved more rapidly after 1979, and in 1981, the second quarter's 13th Sabbath School Overflow Offering set aside by the General Conference for the Central Philippine Union Mission College project gave it a greatly needed funding boost.

1980s
On August 12, 1981, seventeen years after the dream was born, the groundbreaking ceremonies for the college took place. Keynote speaker was Dr. C. D. Hirsch, General Conference Director of Education, and the guest speaker was Negros Occidental governor, the Honorable Alfredo Montelibano, Jr. The actual construction began on Oct. 2, 1981, with architect-contractor Raymundo R Victoriano, donating his services as supervising engineer.

On June 14, 1982, registered with the Department of Education, Culture and Sports (DECS) as Central Philippine Adventist School, the college opened its door to students. There were 100 students and 17 faculty members; Pastor David Recalde was the president. As a Junior or vocational college, Rural Health Nursing, Building Construction, Agriculture, and Biblical Studies were the first courses offered.

Initially there was only one multipurpose building called the Pioneer Hall, to house everybody and everything—the dormitories, faculty homes, administrative offices, cafeteria, library and the gym which is used for chapel, church, and other gatherings.

This single, imposing structure amid the ocean waves of sugarcane earned the moniker, “Noah’s Ark.” In the Ark, the dormitories had no shutters; the faculty apartments had neither shutters nor room divisions, and the classrooms did not have desirable chairs and acoustics.

Then in September 1984, a super-typhoon Nitang struck. But God has a way of turning misfortunes into blessings. Out of the ruins came the funds to rebuild the ark's walls with concrete.

From 1984 onwards, CPAC has seen significant development in staff qualifications, academic programs and physical structure. On October 11, 1985, the name Central Philippine Adventist School was changed to Central Philippine Adventist College upon approval by the DECS of the four-year Agriculture course. New degrees and their corresponding buildings were added to the growing College: Accounting, Computer Science, Education, and Nursing. The Quiet Hour Clinic, Motor Pool, Cafeteria, and the dormitories were constructed to meet the needs of a fast-growing academic community.

2000 to now
By the year 2000, the budding College saw the construction of the Recreation Center, which is equipped with two swimming pools, guesthouses, two tennis courts, and rows of cottages. A gazebo, the Student Government Center, Fast Food Center, the College Store, the three-story building for the School of Nursing, the basement and second floor for the School of Business, and the Mushroom House, literally mushroomed one after another.

School year 2001 marks the founding of the Education That Saves Village, where working students enjoy low-cost housing. In January 2005, the Conference Hall was inaugurated. Meanwhile, the Engineering building, Function Hall, and the College Church were rising almost simultaneously, and inaugurated during CPAC's Silver Anniversary in August 2007. At Vespers of Aug. 10, this Church—one of the tallest, largest and most beautiful in the country—was dedicated to the Lord.

Within the next two years, more parks dotted the college's rural landscape: the Wisdom Park, International Friendship Park, the NSTP guesthouses, and the Tilapia pond. In April 2008, a Worship Hall was built for the working students’ cottage.

On March 20, 2009, two inauguration and dedication ceremonies were held: the Eco-Park beside the cottage area, and the long-awaited Library. The Library, which includes the Review Center and AVR, is on the second floor and stands on two QUADs: the fully renovated Agriculture, and Old Nursing buildings.

The college now offers fourteen curricula in these five Schools/Departments: Business, Nursing, Education, Agriculture and Theology. Two computer laboratories and virtually all offices and faculty homes are wired to the Internet 24/7; all offices and dormitories are equipped with wireless telephones.

The campus also serves as Distance Learning Center (DLC) for the Adventist International Institute for Advanced Studies (AIIAS).

For almost three decades, the college has placed priority on educating skilled professionals who will contribute as denominational employees and leaders. It is developing educated and supportive graduates who will strengthen and enrich their respective congregations.

CPAC also shares the Church's educational philosophy and seeks to function as a resource center which can facilitate the development and spread of the Gospel in the Central Philippines and far beyond.

See also

 List of Seventh-day Adventist colleges and universities
 Seventh-day Adventist education

References

External links

Adventist universities and colleges in the Philippines
Universities and colleges in Negros Occidental
Educational institutions established in 1981
Universities and colleges affiliated with the Seventh-day Adventist Church
1981 establishments in the Philippines